Trinity Transit is a public transportation service in Trinity County, California. Trinity Transit provides services between the communities of Douglas City, Hayfork, Junction City, Lewiston, Redding, Weaverville, and Willow Creek. Regional services connect with neighboring systems: Redding Area Bus Authority in Redding, and Redwood Transit System and Klamath-Trinity Non-Emergency Medical Transportation in Willow Creek. Trinity Transit service is managed by the Trinity County Transportation Commission.

Trinity Transit was originally operated by the Human Response Network (HRN), which began service in 1988.  Service was available to Hayfork, Douglas City, Lewiston, Weaverville and Junction City.  After several months of operation, the service to Lewiston and Junction City were discontinued, leaving the Hayfork to Weaverville service, which included Douglas City.  In March 2008, service was reinstated to Lewiston as a pilot program, along with two new routes to Trinity Center and Willow Creek.  The route to Trinity Center was discontinued after Labor Day in 2009 due to poor ridership. After procuring buses through the American Recovery and Reinvestment Act of 2009, intercity service between Weaverville and Willow Creek was increased to three days per week initially and a route between Weaverville and Redding began.

Trinity Transit now operates four “intercity” fixed routes; all of which operate Monday through Friday.      Year after year Trinity Transit ridership grows; over 15,000 passenger trips were provided in 2015 alone.

Fixed route services

References

External links 
 Trinity Transit

Bus transportation in California
Public transportation in California